Plesiocystiscus larva is a species of sea snail, a marine gastropod mollusk, in the family Cystiscidae.

Distribution
This marine species occurs off Colón (Panama)

References

External links
 [httpsCoovert, G. A.; Coovert, H. K. (1995). Revision of the supraspecific classification of marginelliform gastropods. The Nautilus. 109(2-3): 43-100]://biodiversitylibrary.org/page/8274195

larva
Gastropods described in 1922